The Capital Region was the administrative name of the municipalities of Copenhagen and Frederiksberg and the counties of Frederiksborg, Copenhagen, and Roskilde. It was replaced by the Capital Region of Denmark as an administrative region on January 1, 2007 as part of the 2007 Danish Municipal Reform.

The new region includes the island of Bornholm (in the Baltic Sea 100 nautical miles from Copenhagen), and excludes the southwestern parts of Greater Copenhagen that were covered by Roskilde County. These southwestern areas are instead included in Region Zealand.

Composition
In 2007 the Capital Region had a population of 1,834,492 and an area of 2,861.41 km2

The area consisted of:

Today 
The same area has (31 December 2012) 1,937,450 inhabitants (680 inhabitants/km2)
However the Capital Region has been expanded and Stevns Municipality has been added.
That area is 3030 km2 and has 1,957,611 inhabitants (646 inhabitants/km2).

The Capital Region is still in use at several levels:

 Local public traffic, ticket fare zones (Metro, S-train, Local trains, Regional trains within the area, busses etc.) 
 Television – three regional TV-channels broadcast over the entire area
 The area is a region for Vejdirektoratet, the Danish motorway & road maintenance authority
 It is also a region of the Danish national rail, DSB. If for instance buying a ticket in Jutland, the ticket is valid for any station within the Capital Region.
 Public identification, people that live within its boundaries usually identify themselves as inhabitants of the Capital Region.

References 
 Map showing the extent of Hovedstadsregionen including the extension of Stevns municipality (far Southernmost part)

Copenhagen
Capital Region
Geography of Copenhagen